Local Route 30 Sacheon–Daegu Line is a local route of South Korea that connects Sacheon, South Gyeongsang Province to Seo District, Daegu.

History
The route was originally planned in 1994 as part of an extension of National Route 30 from Daegu to Chaewon, but due to a lack of funding, the route was instead designated as a state-funded local route on 19 July 1996. In 2008, the route was extended to Sacheon.

Stopovers
 South Gyeongsang Province
 Sacheon - Jinju - Goseong County - Jinju - Haman County - Changwon - Changnyeong County - Miryang
 North Gyeongsang Province
 Cheongdo County
 Daegu
 Dalseong County - Suseong District - Nam District - Seo District

Major intersections 

 (■): Motorway
IS: Intersection, IC: Interchange

South Gyeongsang Province

North Gyeongsang Province

Daegu

See also 
 Roads and expressways in South Korea
 Transportation in South Korea

References

External links 
 MOLIT South Korean Government Transport Department

30
Roads in South Gyeongsang
Roads in North Gyeongsang
Roads in Daegu